Bethania may refer to:

Places 
Bethania, North Carolina, Moravian community established 1759
Bethania, Queensland, a suburb of Logan City, Queensland,  Australia
Bethania railway station
Bethany (biblical village), a village near Jerusalem
Bethania, Ceredigion, a hamlet in Wales, home of Tŷ Nant spring water
Bethania, Gwynedd, a village in Wales, adjoining the town of Blaenau Ffestiniog from the east.

Chapels
 Bethania Chapel, Abercynon, former chapel in Wales
 Bethania Chapel, Aberdare, former chapel in Wales
 Bethania Chapel, Cwmbach, former chapel in Wales
 Bethania Chapel, Dowlais, former chapel in Wales
 Bethania Chapel, Mountain Ash, chapel in Wales
 Bethania Chapel, Old St. Mellons chapel in Wales

People 
 Bethania Almánzar (born 1987), Dominican Republic volleyball player
 Bethania de la Cruz (born 1989), Dominican Republic volleyball player
 Maria Bethânia (born 1946), Brazilian singer

Other uses 
 Bethania Hospital, Sialkot, hospital in Pakistan
 Betania Monastery, in the nation of Georgia
 Bethania Rehabilitation Centre, Kerala, India

See also
 Betania (disambiguation)
 Bethany (disambiguation)
 Bettany (disambiguation)